The Changcheng System is a Mesoproterozoic geological formation which has yielded primitive fossil eukaryotes, such as Tappania. It formed around 1.9-1.8 billion years ago as a result of a continental collision in the North China Craton.

References

Mesoproterozoic geology
Geologic formations of China